The .25 Stevens Short was an American rimfire rifle cartridge, introduced in 1902.

Developed by J. Stevens Arms & Tool Company, it was intended to be a lower cost, less potent variant of the .25 Stevens, on which it was based. It initially used a  black powder charge; this was later replaced by smokeless. It was offered in Stevens, Remington, and Winchester rifles, and could be used in any .25 Stevens rifle, also (in the way the .38 Special can be fired in weapons chambered for .357 Magnum).

It was more powerful than the .22 Short, as well as less expensive, but more costly than the .22 Long Rifle and offering no edge in performance. It was also inferior to its parent cartridge. As a result, it was not a popular hunting round.

It was dropped in 1942.

Notes

Sources
Barnes, Frank C., ed. by John T. Amber. ".25 Stevens Short", in Cartridges of the World, pp. 276 & 282–3. Northfield, IL: DBI Books, 1972. .
__ and _. ".25 Stevens", in Cartridges of the World, p. 276. Northfield, IL: DBI Books, 1972. .

Pistol and rifle cartridges
Rimfire cartridges
Stevens Arms